What We Become is a 2015 Danish horror and zombie movie directed by Bo Mikkelson. It premiered on March 31, 2016. A family unravels during a bloody, berserk summer as when a horrifying plague transforms a small town into the flesh-eating walking dead.

Plot 
A family of four, Dino, his wife Pernille, and their children the young Maj and teenaged Gustav are living in idyllic Sorgenfri, Denmark during the summer. Pernille dotes on Maj, who in turn dotes on her pet rabbit, Ninos. Another teen, Sonja, moves in with her mother across the street, much to Gustav's interest. At a picnic one of the neighbours, Casper, tries to persuade Dino to get a gun so they can go hunting together, but Dino refuses. Meanwhile, some picnickers, specifically a little boy is seen throwing up, possibly teasing at the fact that he might be infected. An elderly neighbour comes running to the party and says her husband has died, but upon investigation his body has gone missing.

Over the course of several days, the situation escalates as a deadly virus that reanimates its hosts into hostile killing machines sweeps the neighbourhood, but Dino lies to the children assuring them that everything is alright. Sorgenfri is then quarantined by the military which orders all residents to self-isolate. The military keeps the families supplied but each house is kept strictly incommunicado, hermetically sealed with plastic sheets, and the power frequently fails.

During the night some of the neighbours are dragged from their homes and placed in the back of trucks and gets transported to a "safe space" as the military tells them. Gustav, having snuck out, witnesses that the said "safe space" is actually filled with infected that get shot while having gone out to spy on Sonja and, in a burst of fervor, frees said infected from the big trucks that they are transported in. The military is quickly overrun and retreats, abandoning everyone to their fate. Sonja and her infected mother are taken in at Gustav's insistence against Pernille's protests.

As zombies overrun the neighbourhood, Casper's significant other Anna escapes the house and flees in their car after having made several attempts. Abandoned, Casper joins Dino and prepares for a siege while Sonja's mother grows progressively sicker and the pet bunny Ninos has gone missing. a scene comes up where everyone is eating some kind of stew with meat in it and Maj comes in, asking about her pet rabbit Ninos. The dad explains that rabbits are good runners and has possibly run away, tho the scene highly teases at the possible fact that said stew the family is eating might be Ninos. The infected begin roaming the night and Gustav's habit of peeping with the lights on nearly gets them all killed. Anna eventually returns, thoroughly traumatized. Sonja and Gustav have a romantic interlude as Sonja's mom's condition rapidly deteriorates. When Sonja wakes up in her mother's embrace, she slowly realizes that her mother is in full rigor mortis.

Dino and Casper scout the area, finding an abandoned landscape, except for dead neighbours, surrounded by a wall. After fair warning, and almost refusing to budge, Dino and Casper are fired upon by the military and forced back. Gustav and Sonja are caught red-handed by Pernille, and they discover Maj is missing. Gustav and Sonja go outside to find corpses in the street while, despite his posturing, Casper is killed when they are over-run by a horde of zombies. Dino then robs a woman of her meagre supplies at rifle point even though her protests of her having a family and kids.

Maj, having previously snuck out to find Ninos, sees the neighbour whose husband's corpse went missing at the start of the movie and Maj asks her if she has seen Ninos, only for the neighbour to turn around and reveal that she is actually infected, a big piece of meat missing from her cheek. The neighbour then proceeds to pounce onto Maj and bites her, quickly infecting the young girl. Her family hears her screams and quickly rushes to her safety, killing the infected neighbour with a gunshot. The gunshot attracts a horde and the family retreats. Previous preparations to the house prove adequate against the approaching zombies for the time being. Dino says they have to kill Maj but Pernille hides. She hides in their bedroom with infected Maj, hearing Dino trying to break down the door to kill Maj. Pernille refuses to let him shot her daughter, to which Maj turns into a zombie and proceeds to bite into her mothers cheek and neck, possibly killing her. Dino then hesitates to kill his daughter, so he pulls the rifle on himself, putting it under his jaw and pulling the trigger, only for the gun to emit an empty click. Maj then proceeds to pounce onto Dino and kills him mercilessly at the scene.

Gustav uses fireworks to distract the zombies, although forgetting to take any extra with him, but nonetheless succeeds in escaping with Sonja through the forest.

The camera pans upwards over the forest, revealing stems of smoke coming from somewhere in town. as the camera pans up you hear the sound of a Danish Air raid Siren as the tell tale sound of a nuclear bomb gets dropped onto the city. Before you see the atomic explosion, the screen cuts to black and flashes the word "SORGENFRI" across the screen repeatedly, then cuts to black as the end credits start to roll as a tune start playing.

Cast 
Troels Lyby as Dino
Mille Dinesen as Pernille
Mikael Birkkjær as Casper
Marie Hammer Boda as Sonja
Benjamin Engell as Gustav
Therese Damsgaard as Anna
Diana Axelsen as Dorte
Rita Angela as Elna
Ella Solgaard as Maj

Release 
The film was released in four cinemas across Denmark on March 31, 2016, prompting concern from reviewers that the film could flop due to this. However, the film was made available two weeks later via TDC's streaming service.

The film was released in the US on May 13, 2016.

Reception 
The film received a mixed reception. Politiken gave the film five out of six of hearts and called it "the best Danish horror movie since Ole Bornedal's Nightwatch", while Ekstra Bladet and Berlingske Tidende both gave four stars. Jyllands-Posten gave three out of six stars, but both BT and Jakob Stegelmann of Danish film magazine Ekko only gave two out of six stars.

External links
 

2015 horror films
Films about viral outbreaks
Danish horror films
2010s Danish-language films